The Normal CornBelters are a collegiate summer baseball team based in Normal, Illinois, which is part of the Bloomington-Normal metropolitan area.  The franchise was formerly a professional team, and was a member of the independent Frontier League, which is not affiliated with Major League Baseball.

The CornBelters currently play in the Prospect League's Western Conference in the Great River Division along with the Burlington Bees, Clinton LumberKings, and Quincy Gems.

Stadium
On March 30, 2009, ground was broken for a $12 million multi-purpose stadium adjacent to Heartland Community College on Raab Road.  The CornBelters will share the facility with Heartland's baseball, softball, and soccer programs.  The facility was completed in time for the CornBelters' inaugural 2010 season.

On October 20, 2009, it was announced that the stadium would be known as The Corn Crib. The name was the result of a naming rights partnership with the Illinois Corn Marketing Board (ICMB). The naming rights agreement lasts for two years with an "automatic renewal". Both team and ICMB officials declined to disclose the financial terms of the partnership.

History

Name-the-team contest

The CornBelters were named after a fan vote to determine the name.  A publicity stunt occurred after the four finalists were unveiled:

Normal Nutz; an homage to the Beer Nuts brand based in nearby Bloomington (NOTE: The entries were originally "Nuts," but the ownership modified it to avoid conflict with the California League's Modesto Nuts)
Normal NightHawks; a popular alliterative nickname.
Normal CornBelters; a reference to Illinois' location in the Corn Belt. "Belt" is also a slang term meaning to hit the ball hard.
Normal Coal Bears; submitted by fans of political satirist and The Colbert Report host Stephen Colbert (pronounced [kʰɔlˈbɛɹ], just like "coal bear"). In addition to the reference, Illinois (especially the west side of Bloomington-Normal) also has a strong heritage in coal mining.

In addition, two other choices were later added:

Normal Fellers; an homage to Jesse W. Fell, the founder of Illinois State University (ergo, the founder of the city of Normal), as well as the term "Feller" referring to "regular guy".
Normal CamelBacks; an homage to Camelback Bridge, built to allow steam locomotives to pass underneath and currently arching over Constitution Trail. It is listed on the U.S. National Register of Historic Places.

2010 season
Hal Lanier was announced as the team's first manager on October 7, 2009. Lanier managed the Houston Astros to a division title in 1986 and is a former Major League player and coach as well. Over 21 seasons as a major, minor and independent league manager, Lanier has compiled a record of 1,338-1,033.

The Normal CornBelters' inaugural season schedule was released on October 16, 2009.  The CornBelters' season opened at the Evansville Otters on May 21, 2010. The home opener, the first in team history, was played at 7 p.m. on June 1, 2010, against the Windy City ThunderBolts. The team had 51 home games in 2010 and their season ended on September 5, 2010. The team finished with a 44–52 record. Two CornBelters were named 2010 All-Stars and played in the All-Star Game: RHP Tyler Lavigne and 3B Daniel Cox.

Seasons

Roster

References

External links
Normal CornBelters
CornBelters Collection, McLean County Museum of History

2009 establishments in Illinois
Former Frontier League teams
Professional baseball teams in Illinois
Sports teams in Bloomington–Normal
Baseball teams established in 2009
Defunct Frontier League teams
Defunct independent baseball league teams